Luquillo is a town and municipality of Puerto Rico located in the northeast coast, northwest of Fajardo; and east of Rio Grande. Luquillo is spread over 5 barrios and Luquillo Pueblo (the downtown area and the administrative center of the city). It lends its name to the Sierra de Luquillo, where El Yunque National Forest is located. It is part of the Fajardo Metropolitan Statistical Area.

The city of Luquillo is 26 square miles and it sits on 12 miles of Atlantic coastline. It is nestled between the blue waters of the Atlantic and the El Yunque National Forest, a rainforest, giving it a diverse and unique ecology. Luquillo marks the beginning of the Northeast Ecological Corridor Nature Reserve which runs down the coast from downtown Luquillo all the way down to the Seven Seas Beach in Fajardo. During certain times of the year, it is not unusual to encounter rare or endangered species of fauna (like the leatherback turtle) while visiting in Luquillo.

History
Luquillo was founded in 1797 and is known as "La Capital del Sol" (Capital of the Sun), "La Riviera de Puerto Rico" (the Puerto Rican Riviera), and "Los Come Cocos" (the coconut eaters). Legend says that the town was named after the Indian cacique Loquillo, who died a few years after the last Indian rebellion in 1513. However, the word Luquillo most likely originates from Yukiyu, the Taino name for El Yunque, most likely meaning "white mountain" (i.e. foggy mountain).

On September 20, 2017 Hurricane Maria struck the island of Puerto Rico.  In Luquillo, rivers were breached, there were landslides, the electrical power collapsed, and 1100 homes were destroyed or damaged. Incidents of looting and assaults were reported in the aftermath of the storm.

Geography 
Luquillo is located on the northeast coast.

Barrios
Like all municipalities of Puerto Rico, Luquillo is subdivided into barrios.

Juan Martín
Luquillo barrio-pueblo
Mameyes I has a Playa Fortuna Community
Mata de Plátano has a Playa Fortuna Community
Pitahaya
Sabana

Sectors
Barrios (which are like minor civil divisions) and subbarrios, in turn, are further subdivided into smaller local populated place areas/units called sectores (sectors in English). The types of sectores may vary, from normally sector to urbanización to reparto to barriada to residencial, among others.

Special Communities

 (Special Communities of Puerto Rico) are marginalized communities whose citizens are experiencing a certain amount of social exclusion. A map shows these communities occur in nearly every municipality of the commonwealth. Of the 742 places that were on the list in 2014, the following barrios, communities, sectors, or neighborhoods were in Luquillo: Barrio Pitahaya, Sector Santo Domingo, Mata de Plátano, Río Chiquito, and Sector Fortuna Playa.

Tourism

There are 14 beaches in Luquillo including . , which translates to "The Wall", is considered a dangerous beach. If you stay on the coastal highway going east from San Juan, you'll soon reach Luquillo Beach, officially known as La Monserrate Beach (Balneario de la Monserrate). This huge plantation of majestic coconut palms shades more than a mile of fine and shimmering sand. It is one of the most popular and nicest public beaches in the San Juan metropolitan area. It offers cafeterias, public bathrooms with showers, access for disabled people, and an ample parking lot. La Monserrate Beach is one of the public beaches most frequented by the locals. La Selva, is a small cove on the east coast. It is arguably one of the best surf spots on the east coast. The only way to get to it is about a 2-mile walk through a cow farm, but it's worth the trip if you can talk someone into telling you how to get there.

Landmarks and places of interest

Chief Loquillo Monument
La Fortuna Hacienda 
La Bandera Beach 
La Monserrate Beach, also known as Luquillo Beach
La Pared Beach
Las Pailas Beach 
Mameyes Beach
Ocean View Boulevard
Fortuna Beach
The Recreational Park
The Kiosks at Luquillo Beach
La Selva Reef Break

Economy

Culture

Festivals and events
Luquillo celebrates its patron saint festival in March. The  is a religious and cultural celebration that generally features parades, games, artisans, amusement rides, regional food, and live entertainment.

Other festivals and events celebrated in Luquillo include:
 Leatherback Turtle Festival - April
 - June
Coconut Festival- September
Traditional Cooking Festival- December

Demographics

Government

Like all municipalities in Puerto Rico, Luquillo is administered by a mayor. The current mayor is Jesús Márquez Rodríguez, who was elected at the 2012 general election.

The city belongs to the Puerto Rico Senatorial district VIII, which is represented by two senators. In 2012, Pedro A. Rodríguez and Luis Daniel Rivera were elected as district senators.

Transportation

There is no public transportation in Luquillo, and residents and visitors rely on Uber or Luquillo Taxi & Tours for service.

There are 20 bridges in Luquillo.

PR-3 is the main road through Luquillo. Other municipality roads include PR-983, PR-988, PR-991 and PR-940.

Symbols
The  has an official flag and coat of arms.

Flag
It consists of three horizontal stripes, the blue top and green bottom are double of width of the yellow central stripe. Blue makes reference to the sky and the sea; yellow represents the sand of its beaches and green represents the vegetation of the mountains. In the center stripe resides the coat of arms of the municipality superimposed and surrounded by two palm tree leaves crossed at the bottom.

Coat of arms
In a gold background a centered mountain range with three green mountains is accompanied at the bottom by a bay with blue and silver waves; the top portion of the shield in blue, has three iris branches. Above the shield resides a three tower gold crown. Surrounding the shield by its flanks are two palms trees leaves crossed at the bottom.

Gallery

See also

List of Puerto Ricans
History of Puerto Rico
Did you know-Puerto Rico?

References

External links
 Puerto Rico Government Directory - Luquillo

Municipalities of Puerto Rico
Populated coastal places in Puerto Rico
Populated places established in 1797
Fajardo metropolitan area